Ardisia gardneri is a species of plant in the family Primulaceae. It is endemic to Sri Lanka.

References
 http://www.theplantlist.org/tpl1.1/record/kew-2647976
 http://eol.org/pages/37618001/overview
 http://indiabiodiversity.org/species/show/263620

Flora of Sri Lanka
gardneri